The Shallow Call were an indie rock band from Northwich, England, established in 2004. They played with such notable bands as Catfish and the Bottlemen, The Charlatans, The Pigeon Detectives and The Enemy.

Discography
 "Frank Bruno" (2007)
 "Where We All Hang Around" (2008)
 "I Wanted You More Than You Wanted Me" (2009)

References

External links
 Myspace
 Facebook

English indie rock groups